The Chakhesangs are a major Naga ethnic group inhabiting the Northeast Indian state of Nagaland. Chakhesangs were previously known as the former Eastern Angamis, now recognized as a separate ethnic group. The Chakhesangs are divided into two groups known as Chokri and Khezha. The name "Chakhesang" was created as an acronym from the names of three ethnic groups: the Chakrü (Chokri), Khezha and Southern Sangtam (now Pochury).

Most of the villages fall within Phek District of Nagaland. Two Chakhesang villages (Jessami and Soraphung/Krowemi) are located in the Ukhrul District of Manipur.

Notable personalities 
The following is a list of prominent people belonging to the Chakhesang community.
Zhokhoi Chüzho (b. 1984), Actor
K. G. Kenye (b. 1960), Politician
Vamüzo Phesao (1938–2000), Politician
Chekrovolü Swüro (b. 1982), Archer
Lhüthiprü Vasa (d. 1993), Politician
Mülhüpra Vero (1934–2020), Politician
Seno Tsuhah, Social Activist

See also 
Pochury Naga

References

External links 

Ethnic groups in India
Naga people